The Tort Trial & Insurance Practice Section (TIPS) is a 30,000-member section of the American Bar Association. It is a forum uniting plaintiff, defense, insurance and corporate counsel to advance the civil justice system. The section is broken down into general committees, standing committees and task forces.

General Committees 

Within the Tort Trial & Insurance Practice Section, there are 34 committees which focus on substantive and procedural matters in specific areas of practice. These committees provide opportunities for attorneys and associate members to interact with fellow members, plan and attend CLE programs and write for publications. Additionally, members are given opportunities to learn about new developments and acquire new practice methods to the ever-changing landscape of their area of practice.

General committees Include:

 Admiralty & Maritime Law Committee
 Alternative Dispute Resolution
 Animal Law
 Appellate Advocacy
 Automobile Law
 Aviation and Space Law
 Business Litigation
 Commercial Transportation Litigation
 Corporate Counsel
 Law and Technology
 Law Practice Management
 Employee Benefits
 Employment Law & Litigation
 Excess, Surplus Lines and Reinsurance
 Fidelity and Surety Law
 Government Law
 Health and Disability Insurance Law
 Insurance Coverage Litigation
 Insurance Regulation
 Intellectual Property Law
 International Life Insurance Law
 Media, Privacy and Defamation Law
 Medicine and Law
 Products, General Liability and Consumer Law
 Professionals', Officers' and Directors' Liability
 Property Insurance Law
 Self-Insurers and Risk Managers
 Solo and Small Firm Practitioners
 Staff Counsel
 Title Insurance Litigation
 Toxic Torts and Environmental Law
 Workers' Compensation and Employers' Liability

Standing Committees 

Generally, members who are actively involved in TIPS and who demonstrate such a desire, participate in Standing Committees. These committees focus on the overall development, planning, organization and enhancement of TIPS. Members are appointed to Standing Committees by the incoming Chair of the Section each year.

Standing Committees include, but are not limited to:
• Diversity in the Profession
• Emerging Issues
• Public Relations
• Law in Public Service
• Long Range Planning
• Ethics and Professionalism
• Membership
• Finance
• Technology
• Governmental Affairs
• Various Editorial Boards

Task Forces 

There are a number of different task forces that currently exist and which are created on an ad hoc basis. These task forces provide members with opportunities to become involved in very
specific areas tailored to their practice area. Members are appointed to these task forces.

Task forces include: • Corporate Governance
• Federal Involvement in Insurance
Regulation Modernization
• Leadership-Diversity Initiative
• Outreach to Law Students
• Outreach to Young Lawyers
• Plaintiffs' Involvement
• American Medical Association Guidelines

Meetings 

TIPS has meetings four times a year. Two meetings coincide with the ABA Annual Meeting and ABA Midyear Meeting, in addition to the Fall Leadership Meeting and the Section Conference.

Publications 

The Brief, the Section's quarterly magazine, includes an array of practical articles of interest to plaintiffs' and defense lawyers who practice tort or insurance law. In addition, the "Practice TIPS" section provides practical, how-to advice on practice and litigation matters.

Tort Trial and Insurance Practice Law Journal features in-depth law review articles on insurance litigation, ERISA and employment issues, reinsurance and other critical issues. Once a year, the Journal also includes the "Survey of Tort & Insurance Law," which covers the spectrum of practice from aviation litigation to toxic torts.

TortSource highlights topical tort and insurance law issues and includes technology advice, practice tips and updates on continuing legal education programming. "When I Was A Young Lawyer," "Legislative Update," "In Motion" and a host of other unique columns round out each issue of this quarterly newsletter.

Fidelity & Surety Digest is a quarterly publication containing digest summaries of all published and unpublished (Westlaw) cases and recent articles or publications of current interest to fidelity and surety practitioners, consultants and company claims professionals. This publication is only available to members of the Fidelity and Surety Law Committee.

In addition to the Section periodicals, each TIPS General Committee publishes Committee News. These periodic newsletters, which have a broad distribution base, provide information regarding the specific practice and allow the members an opportunity to author substantive articles.

Officers 

As of August 10, 2016, the current Officers of TIPS are:

 Chair: Sam H. Poteet of Nashville, TN (Manier & Herod)
 Chair-Elect: Holly M. Polglase of Boston, MA (Hermes Netburn)
 Vice-Chair: Roy A. Cohen of Morristown, NJ (Porzio Bromberg & Newman)
 Secretary/Chief Diversity Officer: Thea M. Capone of New York, NY (Baumeister & Samuels)
 Finance Officer: Loren D. Podwill of Portland, OR(Bullivant Houser Bailey PC)
 Revenue Officer: Jay Young of Tampa, FL (Young & Scalan)
 Immediate Past Chair: G. Glennon Troublefield of Roseland, NJ (Carella Byrne)

References

External links 
 Official website

American Bar Association
Organizations established in 1878